The voiceless labiodental plosive or stop is a consonant sound produced like a [p], but with the lower lip contacting the upper teeth, as in [f]. A separate symbol not recognized by the IPA that was occasionally seen, especially in Bantu linguistics, is the qp ligature .

The voiceless labiodental plosive is possibly not phonemic in any language, though see the entry on Shubi. However, it does occur allophonically.

Features

Features of the voiceless labiodental stop:

Varieties

Occurrence

See also
 List of phonetics topics

References

External links
 

Pulmonic consonants
Voiceless oral consonants
Voiceless stops